Raps New Generation is the third and final album released by Wreckx-n-Effect. It was released on September 24, 1996 for MCA Records and featured production from Teddy Riley, "Lil" Chris Smith, Markell Riley and Aqil Davidson. Raps New Generation was both a critical and commercial flop and was the group's only album not to chart on the Billboard 200. The single "Top Billin'" produced by "Lil" Chris Smith and Aqil Davidson however, made it to 38 on the Hot Rap Tracks.

Track listing
"New Generation" – 2:11 
"Tha Show" – 5:10 
"Top Billin'" – 5:09 
"Criminal Minded" – 6:45 
"Harlem (Interlude)" – 1:42 
"Planet Rock" – 3:59 
"Move da Crowd" – 3:55 
"Funky (Interlude)" – 0:40 
"Funk Box" – 4:44 
"Somethin' for da Radio" – 4:06 
"Da Vapors" – 5:30 
"Rap Acting School (Interlude)" – 1:45 
"Boomin' System" – 4:36 
"Grandma (Interlude)" – 2:09 
"Sucka MC's" – 5:25 
"It's Yours (Play on Playa)" – 4:22 
"Outro" – 0:19

1996 albums
Wreckx-n-Effect albums
Albums produced by Teddy Riley